The 2023 Asturian regional election will be held on Sunday, 28 May 2023, to elect the 12th General Junta of the Principality of Asturias. All 45 seats in the General Junta will be up for election. The election will be held simultaneously with regional elections in eleven other autonomous communities and local elections all throughout Spain.

Overview

Electoral system
The General Junta of the Principality of Asturias is the devolved, unicameral legislature of the autonomous community of Asturias, having legislative power in regional matters as defined by the Spanish Constitution and the Asturian Statute of Autonomy, as well as the ability to vote confidence in or withdraw it from a regional president.

Voting for the General Junta is on the basis of universal suffrage, which comprises all nationals over 18 years of age, registered in Asturias and in full enjoyment of their political rights. The 45 members of the General Junta of the Principality of Asturias are elected using the D'Hondt method and a closed list proportional representation, with an electoral threshold of three percent of valid votes—which includes blank ballots—being applied in each constituency. Seats are allocated to constituencies, which are established as follows:

Central District, comprising the municipalities of Aller, Avilés, Bimenes, Carreño, Caso, Castrillón, Corvera de Asturias, Gijón, Gozón, Illas, Las Regueras, Langreo, Laviana, Lena, Llanera, Mieres, Morcín, Noreña, Oviedo, Proaza, Quirós, Ribera de Arriba, Riosa, San Martín del Rey Aurelio, Santo Adriano, Sariego, Siero, Sobrescobio and Soto del Barco).
Eastern District, comprising the municipalities of Amieva, Cabrales, Cabranes, Cangas de Onís, Caravia, Colunga, Llanes, Nava, Onís, Parres, Peñamellera Alta, Peñamellera Baja, Piloña, Ponga, Ribadedeva, Ribadesella and Villaviciosa).
Western District, comprising the municipalities of Allande, Belmonte de Miranda, Boal, Candamo, Cangas del Narcea, Castropol, Coaña, Cudillero, Degaña, El Franco, Grado, Grandas de Salime, Ibias, Illano, Muros de Nalón, Navia, Pesoz, Pravia, Salas, San Martín de Oscos, Santa Eulalia de Oscos, San Tirso de Abres, Somiedo, Tapia de Casariego, Taramundi, Teverga, Tineo, Valdés, Vegadeo, Villanueva de Oscos, Villayón and Yernes y Tameza).

Each constituency is allocated an initial minimum of two seats, with the remaining 39 being distributed in proportion to their populations.

The use of the D'Hondt method may result in a higher effective threshold, depending on the district magnitude.

Election date
The term of the General Junta of the Principality of Asturias expires four years after the date of its previous election. Elections to the General Junta ae fixed for the fourth Sunday of May every four years. The previous election was held on 26 May 2019, setting the election date for the General Junta on Sunday, 28 May 2023.

The president has the prerogative to dissolve the General Junta and call a snap election, provided that no motion of no confidence is in process, no nationwide election is due and some time requirements were met: namely, that dissolution does not occur either during the first legislative session or within the legislature's last year ahead of its scheduled expiry, nor before one year has elapsed since a previous dissolution under this procedure. In the event of an investiture process failing to elect a regional president within a two-month period from the first ballot, the General Junta shall be automatically dissolved and a fresh election called. Any snap election held as a result of these circumstances will not alter the period to the next ordinary election, with elected deputies merely serving out what remains of their four-year terms.

Parliamentary composition

The table below shows the composition of the parliamentary groups in the General Junta at the present time.

Parties and candidates
The electoral law allows for parties and federations registered in the interior ministry, coalitions and groupings of electors to present lists of candidates. Parties and federations intending to form a coalition ahead of an election are required to inform the relevant Electoral Commission within ten days of the election call, whereas groupings of electors need to secure the signature of at least one percent of the electorate in the constituencies for which they seek election, disallowing electors from signing for more than one list of candidates.

Below is a list of the main parties and electoral alliances which will likely contest the election:

Opinion polls
The tables below list opinion polling results in reverse chronological order, showing the most recent first and using the dates when the survey fieldwork was done, as opposed to the date of publication. Where the fieldwork dates are unknown, the date of publication is given instead. The highest percentage figure in each polling survey is displayed with its background shaded in the leading party's colour. If a tie ensues, this is applied to the figures with the highest percentages. The "Lead" column on the right shows the percentage-point difference between the parties with the highest percentages in a poll.

Graphical summary

Voting intention estimates
The table below lists weighted voting intention estimates. Refusals are generally excluded from the party vote percentages, while question wording and the treatment of "don't know" responses and those not intending to vote may vary between polling organisations. When available, seat projections determined by the polling organisations are displayed below (or in place of) the percentages in a smaller font; 23 seats are required for an absolute majority in the General Junta of the Principality of Asturias.

Voting preferences
The table below lists raw, unweighted voting preferences.

Results

Overall

Notes

References
Opinion poll sources

Other

Asturias
Asturias
2020s